Pasch is a crater on Mercury.  Its name was adopted by the International Astronomical Union (IAU) in 2012. Pasch is named for the Swedish painter Ulrika Pasch.

Hollows

Hollows are present on the central peak complex, floor, and walls of Pasch crater.

References

Impact craters on Mercury